Heriaeus hirtus is a species of crab spiders belonging to the family Thomisidae.

Distribution
This species is present in most of Southern Europe.

Habitat
These spiders can be found in sunny environments, in bushes and in stony woodlands, especially on hairy plants, on evergreen trees and shrubs.

Description

These spiders are usually pale green, with a lighter green or pale yellow abdomen, vaguely triangular and longer than wide. The ventral side of the abdomen is green and has rows of black dots. Also legs are green. The body and legs are covered with long white bristles. The cephalothorax is divided longitudinally by a clear median line and usually shows three longitudinal and three  transversal clear lines. Males have a slimmer abdomen, usually with a reddish marking. Females are pale green, with long hairs and spines. The external genital structure of female (Epigyne) is quite pale green, with an almost circular tongue. Three teeth are present on the anterior claws. This species is quite similar to Heriaeus melloteei and to Heriaeus graminicola.

Biology
Adults can be found from March to October. They hunt insects, especially bees, wasps, flies and butterflies.

Bibliography
Latreille, 1819 : Articles sur les araignées. Nouveau Dictionnaire d'Histoire naturelle, Seconde édition, vol. 22, Deterville, Paris.

References

External links
 Galerie Insecte
 Pavouci
 Nature du Gard
 Spiders of North-West Europe

Thomisidae
Spiders described in 1819